Squash at the 2016 South Asian Games were held in Guwahati, India from 10–15 February 2016.

Medalists
Note : Nasir Iqbal's Gold medal in Men's Single was stripped off following getting banned after failing Doping test. Players behind him got medals. Due to Lack of Participants, Bronze Medal in Men's Single was not awarded.

Nasir Iqbal was in Men's team too. Thus the Silver Medal of Pakistan Men's Squash Team was stripped off and given to the next.

Medal table

See also 

 Doping at the 2016 South Asian Games

References

External links
Official website
http://southasiangames2016.nic.in/includes/SAG_Final_Results.pdf

2016 South Asian Games
Events at the 2016 South Asian Games
South Asian Games
Squash at the South Asian Games